Eriothymus is a genus of flowering plant in the family Lamiaceae, first described as a genus in 1835. It contains only one known species, Eriothymus rubiaceus. It is endemic to the State of Minas Gerais in Brazil.

References

Lamiaceae
Endemic flora of Brazil
Monotypic Lamiaceae genera